Sergei Nikolayevich Nikulin (born 1 January 1951) is a former Soviet football player and a current Russian coach.

Honours
 Soviet Top League winner: 1976 (spring).
 Soviet Cup winner: 1977, 1984.
 Olympic bronze: 1980.

International career
Nikulin made his debut for USSR on 30 October 1974 in a UEFA Euro 1976 qualifier against Ireland. He did not play for the national team again until 1979, when he played in a UEFA Euro 1980 qualifier.

External links 
  Profile

1951 births
Sportspeople from Dushanbe
Living people
Soviet footballers
Soviet Union international footballers
Soviet Top League players
FC Dynamo Moscow players
Olympic footballers of the Soviet Union
Olympic bronze medalists for the Soviet Union
Footballers at the 1980 Summer Olympics
Olympic medalists in football
Tajikistani people of Russian descent
Medalists at the 1980 Summer Olympics
Association football defenders